The Four Teens is a Barbershop quartet that won the 1952 SPEBSQSA international competition.

References
 AIC entry (archived)

Barbershop quartets
Barbershop Harmony Society